Oxychona is a genus of air-breathing land snails, terrestrial pulmonate gastropod mollusks in the family Bulimulidae.

Species
Species in the genus Oxychona include:

 Oxychona bifasciata (Burrow, 1815)
  Oxychona blanchetiana (Moricand, 1833)
  Oxychona bosciana (Férussac, 1832)
 Oxychona currani (Bartsch, 1916)
 Oxychona gyrina (Deshayes, 1850)
 Oxychona lonchostoma (Manke, 1828)
 Oxychona maculata Salvador & Cavallari, 2013
 Oxychona michelinae Porto, da Rocha, Johnsson & Neves, 2016
 Oxychona pyramidella (Spix, 1827)
Species brought into synonymy
 Oxychona layardi Hartman, 1889: synonym of Dendrotrochus (Santotrochus) layardi (Hartman, 1889) represented as Dendrotrochus layardi (Hartman, 1889) (original combination)

References

External links
 Mörch, O. A. L. (1852-1853). Catalogus conchyliorum quae reliquit D. Alphonso d'Aguirra & Gadea Comes de Yoldi, Regis Daniae Cubiculariorum Princeps, Ordinis Dannebrogici in Prima Classe & Ordinis Caroli Tertii Eques. Fasc. 1, Cephalophora, 170 pp. [1852; Fasc. 2, Acephala, Annulata, Cirripedia, Echinodermata, 74 [+2] pp. [1853]. Hafniae]
 Breure, A. S. H. & Araujo, R. (2017). The Neotropical land snails (Mollusca, Gastropoda) collected by the “Comisión Científica del Pacífico.”. PeerJ. 5, e3065